Scarr can be a surname. Notable people with the surname include:

 Dan Scarr (born 1994), English footballer
 Dee Scarr, environmentalist and scuba diver from Bonaire
 Elizabeth Scarr, Australian scientist
 Henry Scarr, English shipbuilder (and namesake company)
 Kelli Scarr, American singer and songwriter
 Josephine Scarr English-born Australian archaeologist, mountaineer and author
 Max Scarr (born 1991), English cricketer
 Sandra Scarr (born 1936), American psychologist and writer

See also
Scar (disambiguation)
Skar (disambiguation)